Hell Hole or Hellhole may refer to:

 Gates of hell

Geography
 Hell Hole Gorge, a national park in Queensland
 Hell Hole Reservoir, an artificial, crescent-shaped lake in the Sierra Nevada mountain range
 Hell Hole Swamp, a swamp in northeastern Berkeley County, South Carolina
 Hell Hole, a series of pools associated with the Popolopen Creek in Orange County, New York
 Hellhole (cave), a pit cave in West Virginia
 Hell Hole, a cave in Santa Cruz, California
 Hellhole Wood, near Beamish, County Durham

Entertainment
 Hellhole (1985 film), a women in prison film
 Hellhole (2022 film), a Polish horror film
 Hellhole (novel), a 2011 science fiction novel by Kevin J. Anderson and Brian Herbert
 "Hellhole", a song by the Australian group Witch Hats
 "Hell Hole", a song by Spinal Tap from the 1984 film This Is Spinal Tap